Le Bossu (French for "The Hunchback") may refer to:
 René Le Bossu (1631–1680), French critic
 Le Bossu (novel), a French historical adventure novel by Paul Féval
 Le Bossu (1944 film)
 Le Bossu (1959 film), a film directed by André Hunebelle, starring Jean Marais and Bourvil
 Le Bossu (1997 film), a film directed by Philippe de Broca, starring Daniel Auteuil and Fabrice Luchini
 Adam de la Halle (1237–1288), also known as Adam le Bossu
 Robert de Beaumont, 2nd Earl of Leicester (1104–1168), also known as Robert le Bossu
 Le Bossu, a secondary supervillain in the Batman R.I.P. storyline

See also
 Hunchback (disambiguation)
 Bertrand Bossu (born 1980), French footballer
 Jean Bernard Bossu (1720-1792), French officer and explorer